Carboxypeptidase T (CPT) is an enzyme. This enzyme catalyses the following chemical reaction:

 Releases a C-terminal residue, which may be hydrophobic or positively charged.

This enzyme is isolated from Thermoactinomyces vulgaris.

References

External links 
 

EC 3.4.17